Harald Heide-Steen Jr. (18 August 1939 – 3 July 2008) was a Norwegian actor, comedian and singer. He was the son of Harald Heide Steen.

Biography 
During the 1960s, Heide-Steen. Jr  made the radio programs  Hørerøret, Sugerøret and Pusterøret  at NRK  with Gunnar Haugan and Rolv Wesenlund.

Harald Heide-Steen Jr. is perhaps best known for his role as Dynamitt-Harry in the Norwegian Olsenbanden-movies. He is also known as an improv-comic, often collaborating with Rolv Wesenlund in the late 1960s.

Heide-Steen attended Oslo Cathedral School, completing it in 1958, and started working at NRK in 1959.

Selected filmography 
1951: Kranes konditori as Justus
1951: Storfolk og småfolk as Ola, the son
1953: Skøytekongen
1968: Mannen som ikke kunne le
1970: Balladen om mestertyven Ole Høiland as Jacob Tengsereid
1970: Olsenbanden og Dynamitt-Harry as Dynamite-Harry
1975: Flåklypa Grand Prix
1976: Reisen til julestjernen as the Fool
1990: Herman
1994: Fredrikssons fabrik - The movie
1998 Karl & Co
1999: Olsenbandens siste stikk as Dynamite-Harry

Discography (in selection)

Solo albums 
1970: Harald Synger Griseviser (Camp Records)
1978: Harald Heide Steen Jr. (Polydor Records)
1979: Av Riksturistsjef Johansen Annaler 1978/79 (Zarepta Records), with Totto Osvold
1985: Live At Gildevangen (Camp Records), as Sylfest Strutle
2008: Musikalske Minner (Big Box Records)

Collaborations 
With Rolv Wesenlund
1968: Feriebiskop Fjertnes Slår Til Igjen! (Cappa Records)
1971: Hjertelig Tilstede (Cappa Records)
1979: Dagbladets Sommerkassett Alltid Foran (Dagbladet), with Ole Paus, Elsa Lystad and Anne-Karine Strøm
1980: Det Er Ingen Skam Å Snu - En Sports- Og Friluftsplate Av Geilokameratene (Zarepta Records), with Ole Paus
1980: Jeg Tror Folk Er Blitt Spenna Gærne (NorLP), with Ole Paus and Anne-Karine Strøm

Novel by Roald Dahl read by Harald Heide-Steen Jr.
2001: Georgs Magiske Medisin (NRK Lydbokforlaget)

References

External links 

1939 births
2008 deaths
Norwegian male radio actors
Norwegian male comedians
Deaths from lung cancer
Deaths from cancer in Norway
Spellemannprisen winners
Leonard Statuette winners
Norwegian male film actors
20th-century Norwegian male actors
People educated at Oslo Cathedral School
20th-century Norwegian male singers
20th-century Norwegian singers
20th-century comedians